, commonly known as Seiko, is a Japanese maker of watches, clocks, electronic devices, semiconductors, jewelry, and optical products. Founded in 1881 by Kintarō Hattori in Tokyo, Seiko introduced one of the first quartz watches and the first quartz watch with a chronograph complication.

Seiko is perhaps best known for its wristwatches. Along with Rolex, Seiko is one of only two watch companies considered to be vertically integrated. Seiko is able to design and develop all the components of a watch, as well as assemble, adjust, inspect and ship them in-house. Seiko's mechanical watches consist of approximately 200 parts, and the company has the technology and production facilities to design and manufacture all of these parts in-house.

The company was incorporated (K. Hattori & Co., Ltd.) in 1917 and renamed Hattori Seiko Co., Ltd. in 1983 and Seiko Corporation in 1990. After reconstructing and creating its operating subsidiaries (such as Seiko Watch Corporation and Seiko Clock Inc.), it became a holding company in 2001 and was renamed Seiko Holdings Corporation on July 1, 2007. Seiko Holdings Corporation was renamed Seiko Group Corporation as of October 1, 2022.

Seiko watches were originally produced by two different Hattori family companies (not subsidiaries of K. Hattori & Co); one was Daini Seikosha Co. (now known as Seiko Instruments Inc., a subsidiary of Seiko Holdings since 2009) and the other was Suwa Seikosha Co. (now known as Seiko Epson Corporation, an independent publicly traded company). Having two companies both producing the same brand of watch enabled Seiko to improve technology through competition and hedge risk. It also reduced risk of production problems, since one company can increase production in the case of decreased production in the other parties.

At present, quartz and Spring Drive watches are manufactured in Shiojiri, Nagano (Seiko Epson), and mechanical watches in Shizukuishi, Iwate (Morioka Seiko Instruments). Some of the watches exported abroad, such as the Seiko 5, are also manufactured in Ninohe, Iwate, by Ninohe Tokei Kogyo (Established in 1974 as a parts factory for Seiko).

History

1881 founding to 1929 
In 1881, Seiko founder Kintarō Hattori opened a watch and jewelry shop called "K. Hattori" in Tokyo. Kintarō Hattori had been working as clockmaker apprentice since the age of 13, with multiple stints in different watch shops, such as “Kobayashi Clock Shop”, run by an expert technician named Seijiro Sakurai; “Kameda Clock Shop” in Nihonbashi; and “Sakata Clock Shop” in Ueno, where he learned how to both sell and repair timepieces.

Around the time of Seiko's founding, watchmakers in Tokyo, Osaka, and Nagoya were studying and producing pocket watches based on Western products. Japanese wholesalers needed to purchase all the imported timepieces from foreign trading companies established in Yokohama, Kobe, and other open port areas.

In 1885, Mr. Hattori began dealing directly with these foreign trading firms in the Yokohama settlement focused on the wholesaling and retailing of western (imported) timepieces and machinery.

Over the years, Kintarō Hattori developed a close partnership with multiple foreign trading firms, including C&J Favre-Brandt, F. Perregaux & Co., Zanuti & Cie. and Siber & Brennwald, allowing him to obtain exclusive imported timepieces and machinery, which was not available elsewhere at that time.

Hattori's shop became increasingly popular due to the rarity of the imported watches the shop was selling, which couldn't be found anywhere else in Japan. The growing success allowed him to relocate the company to the main street of Ginza (Tokyo), still the epicenter of commerce in Japan to this day.

In 1891, 10 years after the establishment of K. Hattori & Co., the 31-year-old Kintaro was appointed director of the Tokyo Clockmaker and Watchmaker Association and member of Tokyo Chamber of Commerce.

In 1892, Hattori began to produce clocks under the name , meaning, roughly, "House of Exquisite Workmanship."

In 1895, the watch dealer purchased the corner of Ginza 4-chome (the present-day location of WAKO), and constructed a building with a clock tower (16 meters from top to bottom), setting up shop at the new address.

Seiko launched its first in-house pocket watch, the Timekeeper, in 1895, the first Japanese-made wristwatch, the Laurel, in 1913, and the first Seiko-branded wristwatch in 1924.

In order to avoid an ill omen believed to be associated with the word "GLORY" in Japanese, Seikosha changed its trade mark to "Seiko" in 1924.

In 1929, the Seiko pocket watch was adopted as the official watch for the drivers of Japanese Government Railways.

1930 to 1990 
Military watches produced for Japanese troops during World War II were manufactured by Seiko, which by 1938, produced 1.2  timepieces a year. The scarcity of raw materials during the war diverted much of Seiko's production to on-board instruments for military aircraft and ships. In contrast to Japan, Germany utilized both domestically produced and Swiss-produced watches. (Switzerland maintained neutrality during the conflict.) Japan's isolation in the Pacific meant the country could not rely on importing foreign timepieces.

In 1951, Seiko broadcast its first radio commercial in Japan, and when Japan's first commercial television station opened in 1953, it broadcast Japan's first television commercial. The first Japanese commercial was supposed to be broadcast as a time signal at noon, but the video technician mishandled the equipment and the commercial lasted only three seconds, and it was rebroadcast at 7:00 p.m. the same day.

In 1956, Seiko launched Japan's first automatic wristwatch, the Automatic. The retail price at the time was 13,500 yen, more than three times the price of men's wristwatches, which were generally in the 4,000 yen range. In the same year, the company released the Marvel, which represented a significant improvement in accuracy, quality, and productivity over the previous model. This was achieved by increasing the outer diameter of the movement compared to the previous model.

In 1958, Seiko developed the "Dia-Shock" anti-shock device.

In 1959, Seiko launched the Gyro Marvel, which featured a revolutionary self-winding mechanism, the Magic Lever, developed by Seiko. The Magic Lever was simple in structure and had high winding performance, and popularized automatic watches among the general public.

In 1960, Seiko released the Grand Seiko, aimed to be the most accurate wristwatch in the world.

Seiko quickly developed quartz technology in preparation for the 1964 Tokyo Olympics, and in 1963 launched the Seiko Crystal Chronometer, a dramatically smaller version of its previous quartz clock. The quartz clock Seiko had supplied to a broadcasting station in 1959 was about the size of a wardrobe, but this new product ran on two batteries and was portable. At the Tokyo Olympics, Seiko's mechanical stopwatches were selected as the official Olympic watches due to their high accuracy.

Seiko launched Japan's first chronograph wristwatch, the Crown Chronograph, in 1964, Japan's first world time wristwatch in the same year, and Japan's first diver's wristwatch in 1965. In 1967, Japan's first diver's watch with 300m water resistance was launched.

In 1967, Seiko won second and third place in a watch accuracy competition at a Neuchâtel Observatory competition; the competition was canceled after that year.

In 1968, Seiko took first place in a Geneva Observatory competition with a score of 58.19, surpassing all previous records. Swiss companies ranked first to third for their quartz movements and Seiko ranked fourth to tenth for its mechanical movements. In the competition, there were special movements for the competition.

In 1969, Seiko launched the Astron, the world's first production quartz watch; when it was introduced, it cost the same as a medium-sized car. Seiko later went on to introduce the first quartz chronograph. The year 1969 marked the launch of the Astron, as well as several other wristwatches that Seiko positioned as its own historical models. In the same year, Seiko introduced the Five Sport Speed Timer, the world's first Magic Lever watch with a vertical clutch and column wheel. It was a resounding success for its compactness and practicality, and had a major influence on subsequent chronographs around the world. The company also launched the Grand Seiko V.F.A., a mechanical wristwatch with ultra-high accuracy of plus or minus two seconds per day, and the U.T.D., a mechanical wristwatch with a thickness of 1.98 mm.

Since the 1970s, Seiko has introduced a variety of wristwatches with various world firsts: in 1973, Seiko introduced the world's first wristwatch with a LCD display capable of displaying six digits for hours, minutes and seconds; in 1975, Seiko introduced the world's first digital watch with a stopwatch function and a diver's watch with a titanium case. In 1978, Seiko introduced the world's first quartz diver's watch with a water resistance of 600 meters; in 1982, the world's first wristwatch with a television; in 1983, the world's first wristwatch with a record-and-play function and an analog quartz chronograph; in 1984, the world's first wristwatch computer; and in 1986, the world's first diver's watch with a ceramic case water-resistant to 1000 meters.

In 1974, Seiko launched Credor, a luxury brand using precious metals and jewelry, and in 1979, Alba, a low-priced brand for young people.

In 1985, Orient and Seiko established a joint factory.

In 1986, Baselworld allowed non-European manufacturers to participate, and Seiko began exhibiting that year.

In 1988, Seiko invented the world's first wristwatch with an innovative mechanism called "Auto Quartz", in which a rotating oscillating weight rotates in response to the wearer's arm movements, generating electricity to power the quartz. This mechanism was developed with the aim of creating a quartz watch that does not require battery replacement. This mechanism was adopted as Seiko's core movement and later renamed "A.G.S.". (Automatic Generating System). In 1991, to increase popularity, the watches were relaunched under the name "Seiko Kinetic".

Recent development 
In 1998, Grand Seiko was released with the first new mechanical movement in 20 years.

In 1999, Seiko launched Spring Drive, the world's first mechanical wristwatch with the accuracy of quartz.

In 2004, the Astron, launched in 1969, was selected as an IEEE milestone. In the same year, Seiko began operating the Shizukuishi Watch Studio, which specializes in high-end watches.

In 2005, Seiko launched the world's first solar-powered analog watch that adjusts its accuracy by receiving three radio signals from Japan, Germany, and the United States.

In 2006, Seiko launched the world's first wristwatch based on microcapsule E-ink technology. This watch was the first Seiko watch to win an award at the Grand Prix de Genève for its innovative ability to bend the display part, in addition to providing more contrast and a wider viewing angle than conventional LCD displays.

In 2010, Seiko launched the world's first solar radio-controlled digital watch based on the active matrix EPD system, advancing the expression of information in digital watches.

In 2012, Seiko launched the world's first GPS solar watch, the Seiko Astron GPS Solar. Seiko positioned this watch as the second revolutionary wristwatch after the Astron, which was launched in 1969, and described that it had the ultimate practical functionality, being able to instantly display extremely accurate time anywhere in the world and working as long as there is light. Seiko's low power consumption GPS receiver contributed to the practical application of this watch.

Seiko Group

K. Hattori & Co. (currently Seiko Group Corporation) was one of the three core companies of the former Seiko Group. Seiko Group consisted of K. Hattori (SEIKO), Daini Seikosha (currently Seiko Instruments Inc., SII), and Suwa Seikosha (currently Seiko Epson Corporation, EPSON). Although they had some common shareholders, including the key members of the Hattori family (posterity of Kintarō Hattori), the three companies in the group were not affiliated; they were managed and operated independently.

On January 26, 2009, Seiko Holdings and Seiko Instruments announced the two companies would merge on October 1, 2009, through a share swap. Seiko Instruments became a wholly owned subsidiary of Seiko Holdings as of October 1, 2009.
On October 1, 2022, Seiko Holdings was renamed Seiko Group. Epson still develops and manufactures some of the Seiko's highest grade watches, but is managed and operated completely independently from Seiko Group.

Subsidiaries

 Seiko Watch Corporation — Planning for watches and other products and domestic and overseas sales
 Seiko Nextage Co., Ltd. — watches: Alba and licensed brand watches
 Seiko Clock Inc. — Development, manufacturing and sales of clocks (desk clocks, wall clocks, alarm clocks, musical clocks)
 Seiko Service Center Co., Ltd. — repair and after service for watches
 Seiko Time Systems Inc. — Sale and incidental installation work for system clocks, varied information display equipment and sports timing equipment, as well as timing and measurement services for various sports
 Seiko Precision Inc. — Manufacturing/sales for electronic devices, shutters for cameras and peripherals, and production equipment
 Seiko NPC Corporation — Development, manufacturing and marketing of integrated circuits (IC)
 Seiko Solutions Inc. — Development, manufacturing, sales, maintenance, services and consultations for the hardware and the software relating with information systems and network services
 Seiko Optical Products Co., Ltd. — Wholesale marketing of lenses and frames for glasses along with other optical-related products
 Seiko Instruments Inc. — Development, manufacturing and sales of watches, precision components and machine tools, electronic components, printers, measurement and analysis instruments
 Wako Co., Ltd. — Sales of watches, jewelry, accessories, interior supplies, art goods and crafts, glasses and foodstuffs
 Cronos Inc. — retail sales of watches, jewelry items and eyeglasses
 Seiko Business Services Inc. — human resources
 Ohara Inc. (Seiko owns 32.2% ) — specialty optical glass (glass materials for lenses and prisms)

Marketing 
On January 10, 2014, on the eve of the Australian Open in Melbourne, Shinji Hattori, President of Seiko Watch Corporation, presented to Novak Djokovic a Seiko 5 limited edition worth $1700. It was launched worldwide with a million units, symbolizing Seiko's partnership with the world's no.1 professional tennis player.

Seiko – often criticised for quality standards that let misaligned chapter rings and bezels slip through – decided to move its brand positioning upmarket; in 2015, the Financial Times reported the Spring Drive movement’s enthusiastic reception prompted Seiko's launch of higher-end pieces. Harvard Business School reported: "In 2003, Shinji Hattori, a great-grandson of Seiko's founder, became Seiko Watch Company's president and CEO and felt that Seiko should raise its perceived image outside Japan. In management's view, Seiko could claim distinction as the only 'mechatronic manufacturer' in the world – a vertically integrated watchmaker that excelled in both mechanical watchmaking and micro-electronics."

Seiko in the United States
Seiko Corporation of America distributes Seiko watches and clocks, as well as Pulsar and Lorus brand watches, in the United States. The models available in the United States are typically a smaller subset of the full line produced in Japan. Seiko Corporation of America is headquartered in Mahwah, New Jersey, alongside the Coserv repair center. In the United States, Seiko watches are sold primarily by fine jewelers, department stores, and 19 Seiko company stores.

Brands and product lines 
Seiko produces watches with quartz, kinetic, solar, and mechanical movements of varying prices, ranging from around ¥4,000 (US$45) to ¥50,000,000 (US$554,000). Seiko has created many different brands in Japan and the international market including Lorus, Pulsar, and Alba.

Seiko has several lines such as the Seiko 5, luxury "Credor," "Prospex," "Presage," "Velatura" and the "Grand Seiko" series.

Seiko 5 

Seiko 5 is a sub brand that spawned with the introduction of the Seiko Sportsmatic 5 in 1963. Since then, many models have been introduced into the lineup, comprising a variety of different styles.

The name of the Seiko 5 sub brand is a reference to 5 attributes that any watch belonging to it would typically exhibit, those being:
 An automatic watch movement
 The day and the date displayed on the dial
 Water resistance to an acceptable degree
 A recessed crown at the 4 o'clock position
 A durable case and bracelet
In spite of their association with the brand, not all of these characteristics are universal across the lineup, as certain models have omitted the Day-Date display (such as the SSA333) and/or the 4 o'clock positioning of the crown (such as the SRPG31K1 and the aforementioned SSA333).

Seiko released many models under the Seiko 5 sub brand, including large and small divers; watches featuring different strap options, such as leather, nylon, or steel; transparent, or sterile case-back versions; and many other variations. Today, the Seiko 5 lineup mostly comprises entry-level mechanical watches as an affordable entry point for consumers entering the world of automatic watches.

Seiko Lord Matic 
The Seiko Lord Matic series of wristwatches was a mid-range sub-luxury watch of the 1970s that featured design innovations such as faceted crystals, colorful dials and sporty bracelets.

Seiko Presage 
The Seiko Presage series is an all-mechanical lineup, a step up from the entry-level Seiko 5 models. It has slightly more elaborate designs and complex movements, such as urushi-lacquer dials, and self-winding movements with power reserve indicators. The Presage line watches are usually priced between US$200 to US$3,000.

Seiko entered a cooperation with the traditional cloisonné maker Ando Cloisonné Company from Nagoya to produce the dial for the limited edition in 2018.

Seiko Prospex 

The Seiko Prospex series includes their professional series of watches such as their diving watches, which are typically ISO 6425 rated from 200 to 1000 metres of water resistance. Other watches in the Prospex line include field and pilot style watches.

In 2021, Akio Naito, President of the Seiko Watch Corporation, said that enthusiasts' respect for the brand can "influence the wider range of consumers." This influence can be seen in the Prospex range, where Seiko fans' nicknames resulted in the company eventually adopting these product names. For example, Seiko's own London boutique identifies the Prospex SPB191J1 watch using the fans' sobriquet: "Nicknamed 'Shogun' by fans, meaning Japanese 'Commander-in-chief', because of its strong looks."

Grand Seiko 
Prior to 1960, to challenge the status of Swiss watches and change the perception of Japanese watches, Daini Seikosha and Suwa began the discussion of a product line that can match the quality of Swiss watches under the suggestion of the parent company. At the time, Suwa Seikosha Co. was in charge of manufacturing men's watches, so it was decided that Suwa would be producing the first Grand Seiko (GS).

The first Grand Seiko, released in 1960, was based on Seiko's previous high-end watch, CROWN. This Grand Seiko has a 25-jewel, manual-winding, 3180 caliber, and its production was limited to 36,000 units. The watch was also the first chronometer-grade watch manufactured in Japan and was based on Seiko's own chronometer standard.

Some Grand Seiko timepieces also incorporate the company's Spring Drive movement, a movement that is a combination of both automatic and quartz timekeeping methods, leading to unparalleled accuracy in the world of automatic wristwatches. The most famous example is the SBGA011 Grand Seiko "Snowflake", housing the 9R Spring Drive movement.

With the repositioning of Grand Seiko from a Seiko subbrand to an independent brand in 2017, Grand Seiko aimed to transition to a true luxury brand. In 2022, 'Kodo Constant-Force Tourbillon SLGT 003', featuring the world's first combination tourbillon and constant-force mechanism on the same axis, was released, priced at 370,000 euros.

Design style 

The design language of the Grand Seiko was set in 1967, with the creation of Grand Seiko 44GS. The 44GS set the ground for all future Grand Seiko with nine elements. These elements help improve the legibility of the watch under different situations, and create a sharp, crisp visual impression:
 Double width index at 12 o'clock
 Multi-faceted rectangular markers
Highly polished bezel
 Highly polished planes and two-dimensional surface
 Half recessed crown
 Flat dial
 Multi-faceted hour and minute hands
 Curved side line
 Reverse slanted bezel wall and case side
 Dress style with simple but beautiful design
 Zaratsu polishing

King Seiko 
The King Seiko line was created by Daini Seikosha to compete directly with Grand Seiko. The first King Seiko was released the year after the first Grand Seiko, in 1961. The first King Seikos were made with unmarked, manual winding, 25 jewel movements, that were not internally tested chronometers. This was followed by the release of the '44KS' movement in 1964, a remake of the 44GS, a manual winding, 18,000 bph, movement with a screwdown case back. In 1968, the 45KS was introduced with a manual winding, 36,000 bph hi-beat movement – again meant to compete with the 45GS but generally less accurate and with less finishing. King Seiko Certified Chronometer and Superior Certified Chronometers were released between 1968 and 1970. These first two were produced by Daini Seikosha but one of the most impressive King Seikos, the 56KS, was actually made by the Suwa Seikosha. The King Seiko 56KS movements were the same as those used in Grand Seiko’s 56GS series, Seiko Lord Matic watches, and Seiko chronometers. It was also introduced in 1968 and featured an automatic, 28,800 bph movement with 25 jewels and a 47-hour power reserve. These watches were all marked ‘Hi-Beat’ on the dial despite being only 28,800 bph (instead of 36,000). The 56KS was made until 1975, when the King Seiko line was discontinued by the company.

The last King Seiko collection was made by Daini, and was the 52KS, starting off in 1971 and made until 1975. This line used the 5245 and 5246 movement. These were meant to be high-end chronometers, with some even marked ‘V. F. A.’ (Very Fine Accuracy) or ‘Special’ on the dial. Many  of these were of the "Vantac" sub-line and featured colorful dial faces and faceted crystals.

Other 
Seiko produces electronic devices as well; during the 1980s, the company produced a notable range of digital synthesizers, such as the DS-202 and DS-250, for use in electronic music. Today the music division (part of Seiko Life Sports) produces metronomes and tuning devices.

Movements

Mechanical movement 
In 1968, Seiko introduced three ten beat (ten ticks per second) calibers, the automatic caliber 61GS, the manual winding 45GS and 19GS for women's watch. The 61GS was Japan's first automatic ten beat watch, and it was the most accurate mechanical watch due to the high beat calibers. The calibers are considered high beat because normal mechanical movements beat six to eight times per second, and higher beat makes the watch more resistant to shock, thus achieving the high accuracy.

In 2009, Seiko released the new ten beat caliber 9S85, which is a completely new design from the previous high beat caliber. The new caliber also met the Grand Seiko Standard, a chronometer certification that the company claims to be more strict than the Chronometer Certificate in Switzerland.

List of Seiko mechanical movements

Quartz movement 

On December 25, 1969, Seiko released the world's first quartz watch, the Seiko Quartz ASTRON, marking the beginning of the quartz revolution. The watch used a crystal oscillator for accuracy, where the crystal generates steady vibration when voltage is applied to it. During the ten years of development at Suwa Seikosha, Seiko managed to create many parts which enabled the viable application of quartz in wristwatches. For example, Seiko cut the crystal oscillator into the shape of a tuning-fork, and developed an integrated circuit and step motor to operate with the signals from the crystal oscillator.
Although creating the parts that enabled quartz watches, Seiko did not monopolize the patent rights for the unique pieces, but decided to open them.

In 1973, Seiko announced the world's first LCD quartz watch with six-digit digital display.

In 1975, Seiko launched the world's first multi-function digital watch, the 0634.

In 1978, Seiko released the Twin Quartz watch to address the effect t of temperature on the frequency of the quartz crystal oscillator, which put a limitation on the accuracy of quartz watches. Seiko put a second crystal in the watch that is linked with a processor that detects the change in temperature and signals the main oscillator to compensate. The result was a huge improvement in the watch's accuracy from five seconds per month to five seconds per year.

Kinetic watches were introduced by Seiko in 1986 at the Basel Fair Trade Show. These quartz watches use the motion of the wearer's wrist to charge their battery.

Grand Seiko 9F quartz movement 
The 9F quartz movement is used in Grand Seiko quartz watches.

The Grand Seiko's 9F quartz movement is assembled entirely by hand by two expert craftsmen.

Features include:
 Backlash auto-adjust mechanism
 Twin pulse control motor
 Instant date change mechanism – it can change the date display in 1/2000th of a second

Spring Drive 

The Spring Drive was announced in 1997, developed by Yoshikazu Akahane and his team, and inspired by Yoshikazu's vision: "a watch wound by a mainspring and with one-second-a-day accuracy, a precision that only the finest electronic watches could deliver." The movement achieved high accuracy with one second per day, long power reserve (72 hours) with its unique developed alloy, fast winding with the "Magic Lever" design and glide-motion movement with the watch hands.

The movement uses a mainspring as a source of energy and transmits it through a gear train, just like a traditional mechanical watch, but instead of an escapement and balance wheel, Seiko used the newly developed "Tri-synchro regulator," which acts like a quartz movement. The Tri-synchro regulator has three main functions: controlling the mechanical energy of the mainspring, generate electricity for the low consumption (~25 nanowatts) quartz crystal oscillator and generate a magnetic force to regulate the glide wheel. By replacing the traditional escapement with a magnetic brake, the Spring Drive operates with lower noise and presents a glide motion hand that shows the continuous flow of time. The Spring Drive movement was also used as the basis for the first-ever watch designed to be worn by an astronaut during a space walk, the aptly named Seiko Spring Drive Spacewalk.

Sponsorships

Official timekeeper 
Seiko has been the official timekeeper of many major sporting events:

Olympic Games 
 1964 Summer Olympics in Tokyo, Japan
 1972 Winter Olympics in Sapporo, Japan
 1992 Summer Olympics in Barcelona, Spain
 1994 Winter Olympics in Lillehammer, Norway
 1998 Winter Olympics in Nagano, Japan
 2002 Winter Olympics in Salt Lake City, Utah, United States

FIFA World Cup 
 1978 FIFA World Cup in Argentina
 1982 FIFA World Cup in Spain
 1986 FIFA World Cup in Mexico
 1990 FIFA World Cup in Italy

Seiko also released official products for the 2002 FIFA World Cup held in Japan and South Korea, without being the official timekeeper.

IAAF World Championships 
Currently, Seiko has an agreement with World Athletics to act as the timekeeper for the latest editions of the World Athletics Championships. The agreement started in 1985 and is set to continue until at least 2029.

Tennis tournaments 
Throughout the history, Seiko has been the official timekeeper for many tennis tournaments.
 Seiko Super Tennis in Tokyo, Japan (1978–1995)
 French Open in Paris, France (1980–1991)
 Pan Pacific Open in Tokyo and later in Osaka, Japan (1984–present)

Other sponsorships 
Seiko developed a digital watch styled after Venom Snake's timepiece in Metal Gear Solid V: The Phantom Pain under its Wired brand. It was launched on September 2, 2015, with the Metal Gear installment. It was limited to 2,500 pieces worldwide and was sold out via pre-orders within 5 minutes of launch. The box of the watch was designed by Metal Gear Solid artist Yoji Shinkawa. Seiko is also named as the official timekeeper of the Gran Turismo racing game series, published by Sony Computer Entertainment. It was also the sponsor of FC Barcelona from 2011 to 2014.

Seiko was the official timekeeper of the North American Soccer League during the 2014 season.

Seiko previously sponsored Honda F1 (formerly known as BAR [British American Racing] Honda). The Honda team driver, Jenson Button, was the brand ambassador of Seiko. The company name appeared on the team's clothing, Button's helmet, and on the pitstop lollipops. The sponsorship lasted until the end of the 2008 season, when Honda discontinued participating in F1 racing.

Seiko has a partnership with tennis player Novak Djokovic, which started in 2014 and is set to continue at least until 2020.

Seiko is the current major sponsor for the No. 20 Team 18 Holden ZB Commodore driven by Scott Pye in the Supercars Championship.

References and footnotes

Further reading
 Donzé, Pierre-Yves. "Dynamics of innovation in the electronic watch industry: a comparative business history of Longines (Switzerland) and Seiko (Japan), 1960-1980." Essays in Economic & Business History 37.1 (2019): 120-145. online
Dahlman, Chris (2021). This Is Gyachung: The Story of Seiko's First Professional Mountaineer's Watch.

External links 

 Seiko Group Corporation website

New research in This Is Gyachung proves that Seiko's first professional watch came earlier than we had previously thought. (hodinkee.com)

 
Japanese companies established in 1881
Belgian Royal Warrant holders
Clock manufacturing companies of Japan
Holding companies based in Tokyo
Conglomerate companies based in Tokyo
Eyewear brands of Japan
Manufacturing companies established in 1881
Computer printer companies
Electronics companies of Japan
Japanese brands
Lens manufacturers
Luxury brands
Semiconductor companies of Japan
Synthesizer manufacturing companies of Japan
Watch brands
Watch manufacturing companies of Japan
Watchmaking conglomerates
Musical instrument manufacturing companies of Japan
Companies listed on the Tokyo Stock Exchange
1940s initial public offerings